Mark Wayne Salling (August 17, 1982 – January 30, 2018) was an American actor and musician known for his role as Noah "Puck" Puckerman on the television series Glee.

Salling studied at the Los Angeles College of Music before working as a guitar teacher. He also worked as an occasional actor, appearing in Children of the Corn IV: The Gathering (1996) and The Graveyard (2006) before gaining a recurring role in Glee in 2009. Initially a regular character, from the fifth season he was reduced to a recurring guest star role. On the show, he soloed and dueted on cover versions of various songs. Pursuing a music career, he established his own label, Pipe Dreams Records, in partnership with Fontana Distribution. On this label he released an album, Pipe Dreams, in 2010.

In 2015, Salling was arrested for the possession of child pornography. In 2017, he pleaded guilty to the charges as part of a plea deal. He died by suicide on January 30, 2018, before a sentencing hearing scheduled for March 7.

Early life and education
Salling was born in Dallas, Texas, the younger of two children to John Robert Salling Jr., an accountant, and Condy Sue Salling (née Wherry), a school secretary. He was home-schooled at an early age. He attended, but did not graduate from, Culver Military Academy and later graduated from Lake Highlands High School in 2001. While in high school, he was a member of the school wrestling team. After graduating from high school, Salling attended the Los Angeles Music Academy College of Music in Pasadena, California and began studying guitar, giving guitar lessons to make a living.

Career

Music
Salling sang, wrote, and produced his own music under the name Jericho. He also played the piano, guitar, bass guitar, and drums. Jericho's debut album Smoke Signals was released on February 8, 2008 by Jericho Records. On October 25, 2010, Salling released a rock/jazz album, Pipe Dreams, which was inspired by Alice in Chains, Nine Inch Nails, Miles Davis, and Herbie Hancock. It was released by Pipe Dreams Records, Salling's own label, in partnership with Fontana Distribution. He was the composer, performer, and producer of each track. The first single, "Higher Power", premiered on August 10, 2010.

On the television show Glee, he soloed and dueted on cover versions of various songs, including "Sweet Caroline", "Only the Good Die Young", "The Lady Is a Tramp", "Run Joey Run", "Beth", "Just Give Me a Reason", "Good Vibrations", and "Fat Bottomed Girls". During filming, Salling paid tribute to the cast of Glee by writing a song and creating a video titled "Chillin' on Glee'", which featured various cast and crew members.

Acting
Salling acted in Children of the Corn IV: The Gathering (1996) and The Graveyard (2006). In 2008, he was cast as Noah "Puck" Puckerman on the Fox series Glee. On June 28, 2013, it was reported that Salling would not be returning as a regular on Glee fifth season, but would instead be a recurring guest star on the series.

Personal life
Salling dated Glee co-star Naya Rivera from 2007 to 2010, and Playboy model DJ Roxanne Dawn from 2010 to 2011. He resided in Shadow Hills, Los Angeles, California.

Salling was a long-time member of the Echo Park Ornithology Club in Los Angeles, and even penned their theme song. The president and founder of the organization said that Salling "really enjoyed birdwatching a lot, and he really cared about birds... he had a lot of animals at his house and he worked at an animal rescue when I knew him. We went birdwatching together."

Legal issues

Sexual assault charges 
In January 2013, Salling's ex-girlfriend Roxanne Gorzela accused him of committing sexual battery on March 25, 2011, by having unprotected sex without knowledge that it was unprotected. He denied the charges and filed a counter-suit for defamation of character. In March 2015, Salling settled with Gorzela out of court and agreed to pay her $2.7 million.

Child pornography charges 
On December 29, 2015, Salling was arrested at his Los Angeles home on suspicion of possessing several thousand photos and videos depicting child pornography, following a tip-off to the police from one of his ex-girlfriends. He was released later on $20,000 bail, but a search pursuant to a warrant found more than 50,000 images of child pornography, downloaded between April and December 2015, on his computer and USB flash drives. 

On May 27, 2016, he was charged with receiving and possessing child pornography. As a result of the charges, Salling was removed from the cast of Adi Shankar's film Gods and Secrets. 

On September 30, 2017, he pleaded guilty to possession of child pornography, which was expected to result in Salling being sentenced to four to seven years in jail, in addition to registering as a sex offender and entering a treatment program, among other conditions. The guilty plea was formalized on December 18, 2017, and Salling's sentencing date was set for March 7, 2018.

Death
Salling died by suicide by hanging on January 30, 2018, near his home in the Sunland area of Los Angeles. His body was found six hours after he was reported missing. The manner of his death was confirmed by the Los Angeles coroner's office and his death was ruled a suicide.

Filmography

Film

Television

Discography

Studio albums

Singles

References

External links

1982 births
2018 deaths
2018 suicides
20th-century American male actors
21st-century American composers
21st-century American criminals
21st-century American male actors
21st-century American male musicians
21st-century American singers
American acoustic guitarists
American bass guitarists
American male bass guitarists
American male child actors
American male composers
American male criminals
American male drummers
American male film actors
American male guitarists
American male pianists
American male singer-songwriters
American male television actors
American multi-instrumentalists
American people convicted of child pornography offenses
Criminals from Texas
Culver Academies alumni
Guitarists from Texas
Male actors from Dallas
Musicians from Dallas
Record producers from Texas
Singer-songwriters from Texas
Suicides by hanging in California
Missing person cases in California
2010s missing person cases